Dukem River is a river of central Ethiopia.      
                                                                                       

Rivers of Ethiopia